Rhagodeca is a genus of solifuges within the family Rhagodidae. Members of this genus can be found in Oman, Yemen, Israel, and Syria.

Species 

 Rhagodeca fuscichelis 
 Rhagodeca hirsti 
 Rhagodeca impavida

References 

Solifugae
Solifugae genera